The Alps Hockey League (AlpsHL) is a professional ice hockey league based in Central Europe. The league is made up of teams from Austria, Italy and Slovenia. The league was established as a result of a merger between Serie A and the Inter-National League.

Formation

The Alps Hockey League was founded in spring 2016, and is a joint venture between the Austrian Ice Hockey Association, the Federazione Italiana Sport del Ghiaccio, and the Ice Hockey Federation of Slovenia. The three national governing bodies have stated that they are keen to ensure that the league is both of a high standard, and financially viable in the long term. In addition, the league has also stated that it is open to teams from other nations, including the Czech Republic, Germany and Slovakia.

Regarding players, each team can sign a maximum four foreign-born players. The AlpsHL operates on a points-based system, with each team having 36 points available, of which a maximum of 16 can be spent on foreign players. As a result of this, the league aims to focus on the development of young players from the participating countries.

2022–23 teams
In the 2022–23 season, the AlpsHL consists of 15 teams, with 7 teams from Austria, 7 from Italy, and 1 from Slovenia.

Austria
  Bregenzerwald
  Die Adler Stadtwerke Kitzbühel
  Die Zeller Eisbären
  KAC II
  Lustenau
  Red Bull Hockey Juniors
  Steel Wings Linz

Italy
  Cortina Hafro
  Fassa Falcons
  Gherdeina valgardena.it
  Hockey Unterland Cavaliers
  Meran/o Pircher
  Rittner Buam
  Wipptal Broncos Weihenstephan

Slovenia
  SIJ Acroni Jesenice

Notes

Alps Hockey League seasons

References

External links 
Official website

Sports leagues established in 2016
Alps Hockey League
Ice hockey leagues in Slovenia
Top tier ice hockey leagues in Europe
Multi-national ice hockey leagues in Europe
Professional ice hockey leagues in Austria
Professional ice hockey leagues in Italy
Multi-national professional sports leagues